The 2016–17 Dhaka Premier Division Cricket League was the fourth edition of the Dhaka Premier Division Cricket League, a List A cricket competition that was held in Bangladesh between April and June 2017. The tournament started on 12 April 2017 with player transfers beginning on 17 March 2017. Abahani Limited were the defending champions.

The first part of the tournament was played as a round-robin, before progressing to the championship and relegation phase. In the first relegation play-off match, Khelaghar Samaj Kallyan Samity defeated Partex Sporting Club by 8 wickets, therefore relegating Partex and Victoria Sporting Club to the Dhaka First Division Cricket League.

The tournament was won by Gazi Group Cricketers, their first title. Gazi Group, along with Abahani Limited and Prime Doleshwar Sporting Club finished level on points at the end of the Super League phase of the tournament. Therefore, with Gazi Group winning the most head-to-head matches between the three teams, they were crowned champions.

Points tables

Group stage

 Team qualified for the Super League phase of the tournament

Super League

 Champions (based on head-to-head record)

Relegation League

 Team relegated to the Dhaka First Division Cricket League

Fixtures

Round Robin

April

May

Super League

Relegation League

References

External links
 Series home at ESPN Cricinfo

2016-17
Dhaka Premier Division Cricket League
2017 in Bangladeshi cricket
Bangladeshi cricket seasons from 2000–01